Club Atlético Acassuso is an Argentine sports club headquartered in San Isidro, Buenos Aires. The club is mostly known for its football team, which currently plays in Primera B, the regionalised third division of the Argentine football league system.

Acassuso has its own stadium in the Boulogne Sur Mer district, the club plays its home venues at Sportivo Italiano stadium.

History 

The club was established as "Villa Acassuso Football Club" on September 7, 1922, by a group of football enthusiasts from Villa Acassuso in San Isidro Partido. At the end of 1923 the team began to participate in the third division of Asociación Amateurs de Football (a dissident league formed in 1919), winning the title and promoting to the upper division that same year.

In 1923 the club also built its first field because of a donation by Don Ernesto de las Carreras. The field was located on Márquez Avenue and Haedo in San Isidro and was inaugurated on November 4. Two years later the club changed its name to "Club Atlético Acassuso". The name also honored Domingo de Acassuso, founder of San Isidro partido.

Acassuso obtained a place in the official Argentine Football Association league because many of the major clubs had left to form a breakaway professional league, Liga Argentina de Football. Therefore, Acassuso played in the first division, although the squad finished in the last positions before the league was disbanded in 1934. That participation was its only spell in the top division.

Playing at the third division, Acassuso won another title in 1937, therefore promoting to Primera B Metropolitana. In 1946 the team was near to promote to the top level, Primera División, but lost to Argentinos Juniors which finally achieved promotion to the first division.

In 1946 the team was relegated and its field was expropriated by the Municipality. Soon after the club got a land on De las Carreras Avenue and Camino de la Legua and established there. Nevertheless, that new land would be also expropriated. In 1977 the Municipality of San Isidro gave the club a land on Santa Rita street to build a new stadium. It was opened in 1983 under the name "Estadio La Quema".

In 2007 the club was promoted to Primera B after winning both the Apertura 2006 and Clausura 2007 of Primera C.

Players

Current squad

Honours
 División Intermedia (1): 1928
 Segunda División (1): 1923  
 Primera C (2): 1937, 2006–07
 Primera D (2): 1971, 2000–01

Notes

External links

 

Acassuso
1922 establishments in Argentina
Football clubs in Buenos Aires Province
San Isidro Partido